Troubled Souls is a puzzle game developed by Randy Reddig and released by Varcon Systems, Inc. on September 1, 1994, for the Macintosh. It was distributed by MacSoft. Troubled Souls is compatible with System  Software 6 and later.

Gameplay
In the game, the player must connect pieces to make a complete shape until a certain score is reached. Troubled Souls is similar to Pipe Mania.

Development
Troubled Souls was developed by the 17-year-old Randy Reddig. He made it between August 1992 and September 1994, its release month.

Reception

Next Generation reviewed the Macintosh version of the game, rating it three stars out of five, and stated that "With gorgeously bleak H.R. Giger/H.P. Lovecraft-style graphics, nicely gross pulsating hearts for continue markers, and an eerie background melody straddling the line between 'The Twilight Zone' them and the soundtrack from the movie 'Phantasm', this is one title every CRT zombie will enjoy."

Troubled Souls won Electronic Entertainments 1994 "Best Brain-Drain Game" award. The editors wrote that its "game play is compelling, and its haunting music and graphics add to the atmospheric fun." It also took Inside Mac Games "Puzzle Game of the Year" prize.

References

External links and references 
 Le Grenier du Mac - Troubled Souls

Reddig, Randy. Troubled Souls. 1994. Macintosh Garden. N.p.: n.p., n.d. N. pag. Macintosh Garden. Web. 17 Nov. 2010. <http://www.macintoshgarden.org/games/troubled-souls>.
(Currently Unused Source)

1994 video games
Classic Mac OS-only games
Classic Mac OS games
Puzzle video games
Video games developed in the United States
MacSoft games